Scaphognathops stejnegeri is a species of cyprinid fish of the genus Scaphognathops. It inhabits inland wetlands in Cambodia, Laos and Thailand, and is used for food locally. It has been assessed as "least concern" on the IUCN Red List.

References

Cyprinidae
Cyprinid fish of Asia
Fish of Cambodia
Fish of Laos
Fish of Thailand
IUCN Red List least concern species
Fish described in 1931